Alberto Adulai Seidi (born 20 November 1992) is a Guinea-Bissau-born Portuguese footballer who is currently a free agent after leaving North Ferriby United. He started his career at  Premier League club Southampton. He plays primarily as a winger but is also comfortable playing as a centre forward.

Club career

Alberto Seidi was originally a member of the Guinea-Bissau Academy in his home country, before joining English club Southampton as a youth player. He made his debut for the Southampton Under-21s in the Under-21 Premier League in the 2012–13 season, coming on as an 83rd-minute substitute for Jake Sinclair in the second game of the season against the Newcastle United Under-21s on 14 September 2012.

On 10 November 2012, Seidi was signed by local League Two club Aldershot Town from Southampton on a month-long loan deal. He made his debut for the club on the same day, in a 2–0 league loss against Bradford City, coming on as a substitute for midfielder Scott Donnelly in the 60th minute. 

On 4 June 2013, he was released by Southampton due to Seidi not being the player he used to be before his serious injury.

After being released by Southampton, Seidi joined AD Oliveirense in Portugal. In the 2013/14 season Seidi played 9 matches and scored 3 goals. For the 2014/15 season Seidi signed for Espinho who play in the Campeonato de Portugal which is the third tier in Portugal. He played 11 games and scored 1 goal. For the 2015/16 season Seidi signed for Sport Clube União Torreense who also play in the Campeonato de Portugal. He played 8 games, scoring 1 goal. Half way through the season Seidi joined Futebol Clube Cesarense who were in the same league. He played 7 games for them, scoring 1 goal. For the 2016/17 season Alberto Seidi stayed in the Campeonato de Portugal but joined Lusitano Futebol Clube where he went on to play 10 games and scoring 3 goals.

In January 2017 Seidi left Portugal to go play football in Albania where it was rumoured he would play for the most successful club in Albania, KF Tirana. However, when he arrived in Albania he found out he was lied to because instead of signing for KF Tirana in the Superliga he ended up signing for KS Besëlidhja Lezhë in the Albanian First Division. After all this controversy Seidi ended up playing 3 matches and scoring 1 goal for KS Besëlidhja Lezhë before getting injured. He then left the club by mutual consent and returned to England for treatment. in may 2017 Seidi turned down a contract from Flamurtari Vlorë in the Superliga as he did not want to play in Albania.

In June 2017 he joined North Ferriby United after a successful trial at the club. Only being at the club for a short period of time he became the fans favourite. He played 10 games in the National League without scoring a goal. He then left the club in November 2017.

International career
Seidi has been capped twice for the Portugal under-20 team, both in friendlies against the Slovakia under-21s, on 10 and 12 November 2012. In October 2012 he was called up for the first time by the Portugal under-21s, for a warm-up match against the Ukraine under-21 team.

Career statistics

References

External links

1992 births
Living people
Portuguese footballers
Southampton F.C. players
Aldershot Town F.C. players
Workington A.F.C. players
AD Oliveirense players
S.C. Espinho players
S.C.U. Torreense players
English Football League players
Association football forwards